Sir James Herbert (c.1644 – 6 June 1709), of Coldbrook Park, near Abergavenny, Monmouthshire, was a Welsh politician.

He was a Member (MP) of the Parliament of England for Monmouth Boroughs in 1685.

References

1644 births
1709 deaths
17th-century Welsh politicians
English MPs 1685–1687
People from Abergavenny